Lukáš Mihálik (born 10 February 1997) is a Slovak footballer who plays for Slavoj Trebišov as a midfielder.

Club career

Spartak Trnava
He made his professional debut for Spartak against Skalica on 6 November 2015.

References

External links
 FC Spartak Trnava official club profile
 
 Futbalnet profile
 Fortuna Liga profile

1997 births
Living people
Slovak footballers
Association football midfielders
FC Spartak Trnava players
ŠKF Sereď players
FC Lokomotíva Košice players
FK Slavoj Trebišov players
2. Liga (Slovakia) players
Slovak Super Liga players
Sportspeople from Piešťany